Arthur Carter Denison (November 10, 1861 – May 27, 1942) was a United States circuit judge of the United States Court of Appeals for the Sixth Circuit and the United States Circuit Courts for the Sixth Circuit and previously was a United States district judge of the United States District Court for the Western District of Michigan.

Education and career

Born in Grand Rapids, Michigan, Denison received a Bachelor of Arts degree from the University of Michigan in 1883. He was in private practice in Grand Rapids from 1883 to 1910.

Federal judicial service

Denison was nominated by President William Howard Taft on January 17, 1910, to a seat on the United States District Court for the Western District of Michigan vacated by Judge Loyal Edwin Knappen. He was confirmed by the United States Senate on January 31, 1910, and received his commission the same day. His service terminated on October 3, 1911, due to his elevation to the Sixth Circuit.

Denison was nominated by President Taft on February 25, 1911, to a joint seat on the United States Court of Appeals for the Sixth Circuit and the United States Circuit Courts for the Sixth Circuit vacated by Judge Henry Franklin Severens. He was confirmed by the Senate on March 2, 1911, and received his commission the same day. On December 31, 1911, the Circuit Courts were abolished and he thereafter served only on the Court of Appeals. He was a member of the Conference of Senior Circuit Judges (now the Judicial Conference of the United States) from 1924 to 1931. His service terminated on December 31, 1931, due to his resignation. He was the last appeals court judge who continued to serve in active service appointed by President Taft.

Later career and death

Following his resignation from the federal bench, Denison returned to private practice in Cleveland, Ohio from 1932 to 1942. He died on May 27, 1942, in Shaker Heights, Ohio.

References

Sources
 

1861 births
1942 deaths
Judges of the United States District Court for the Western District of Michigan
United States district court judges appointed by William Howard Taft
Judges of the United States Court of Appeals for the Sixth Circuit
United States court of appeals judges appointed by William Howard Taft
20th-century American judges
People from Grand Rapids, Michigan
University of Michigan alumni